{|

  

{{Infobox ship career
| Hide header =title
| Ship country = United Kingdom
| Ship flag =
| Ship name = HMS Papua
| Ship namesake = Territory of Papua
| Ship acquired =25 July 1944
| Ship commissioned = 25 July 1944
| Ship decommissioned =1945<ref name="decommissioning">According to uboat.net HMS Papua (K 588), Papua' is not listed as an active unit on the October 1945 Navy List, strongly implying that the Royal Navy decommissioned her sometime earlier that year.</ref>
| Ship in service = 
| Ship out of service = 
| Ship struck = 
| Ship reinstated = 
| Ship honours = 
| Ship identification = Pennant number: K587 
| Ship fate = Returned to United States 13 May 1946
| Ship notes = 
}}

|}
She originally was ordered by the United States Navy as the Tacoma-class patrol frigate USS Howett (PF-84) and was transferred to the Royal Navy prior to completion.

Construction and acquisition
The ship, originally designated a "patrol gunboat," PG-192, was ordered by the United States Maritime Commission under a United States Navy contract as USS Howett. She was reclassified as a "patrol frigate," PF-84, on 15 April 1943 and laid down by the Walsh-Kaiser Company at Providence, Rhode Island, on 7 September 1943.  Intended for transfer to the United Kingdom, the ship was renamed Papua by the British prior to launching and was launched on 10 October 1943, sponsored by Mrs. William Eastham.

Service history
Transferred to the United Kingdom under Lend-Lease on 25 July 1944, the ship served in the Royal Navy as HMS Papua (K588) on patrol and escort duty. She was decommissioned later in 1945.

Final disposition
The United Kingdom returned Papua to the U.S. Navy on 13 May 1946. She was sold to the Boston Metals Company of Baltimore, Maryland, for scrapping, but her scrapping was cancelled and she was resold 1950 to the Khedivial Mail Line of Alexandria, Egypt, for use as the civilian passenger ship SS Malrouk. Afterwards she was acquired by the Egyptian government, rearmed and commissioned as Misr.Misr'' sank after a collision in the Gulf of Suez on 17 May 1953.

References

Notes

Bibliography
 
 Navsource Online: Frigate Photo Archive HMS Papua (K 588) ex-Howett ex-PF-84 ex-PG-192

External links
 Photo gallery of USS Howatt (PF-84)

1943 ships
Ships built in Providence, Rhode Island
Tacoma-class frigates
Colony-class frigates
World War II frigates and destroyer escorts of the United States
World War II frigates of the United Kingdom
Maritime incidents in 1953
Ships sunk in collisions
Ships of Egypt
Shipwrecks of Egypt